Installer is a scripting language developed by Sylvan Technical Arts and published by Commodore International for AmigaOS, first released for version 2.1 in 1992. Its grammar is based on the LISP programming language. A compatible re-implementation named InstallerLG is actively developed as of October 2018.

Example from the developer guide:

(makedir "T:fred"
	(prompt "I will now create the directory \"T:Fred\"")
	(help @makedir-help)
	(infos)
	(confirm)
)

The InstallerGen tool can be used as an alternative for writing scripts by hand.

References

External links 
 Amiga Technologies V43.3 Installer development package
 InstallerLG alternative
 MUI alternative

Amiga APIs
Amiga development software
AmigaOS
Scripting languages
CBM software
Free installation software
Installation software